SS Archimedes was a steamship built in Britain in 1839. She was the world's first steamship to be driven successfully by a screw propeller.

Archimedes had considerable influence on ship development, encouraging the adoption of screw propulsion by the Royal Navy, in addition to her influence on commercial vessels. She also had a direct influence on the design of another innovative vessel, Isambard Kingdom Brunel's , then the world's largest ship and the first screw-propelled steamship to cross the Atlantic Ocean.

Background

The principle of moving water with a screw has been known since the invention of the Archimedes' screw, named after Archimedes of Syracuse who lived in the 3rd century BC. It was not until the 18th century however, and the invention of the steam engine, that a practical means of delivering effective power to a marine screw propulsion system became available, but initial attempts to build such a vessel met with failure.

In 1807, the world's first commercially successful steam-powered vessel, Robert Fulton's , made its debut. As this vessel was powered by paddlewheels rather than a propeller, the paddlewheel thereby became the de facto early standard for steamship propulsion. Experimentation with screw propulsion continued in some quarters, however, and between 1750 and the 1830s numerous patents for marine propellers were taken out by various inventors, though few of these inventions were pursued to the testing stage, and those that were proved unsatisfactory for one reason or another.

Ericsson and Smith

In 1835, two inventors in Britain, John Ericsson and Francis Pettit Smith, began working separately on the problem. Smith, a farmer by trade who had entertained a lifelong fascination with screw propulsion, was first to take out a screw propeller patent on 31 May, while Ericsson, a gifted Swedish engineer then working in Britain, filed his patent six weeks later.

Smith quickly built a small model boat to test his invention, which was demonstrated first on a pond at his Hendon farm, and later at the  Royal Adelaide Gallery of Practical Science in London, where it was seen by the Secretary of the Navy, Sir William Barrow. Smith would subsequently file a revised patent in keeping with this accidental discovery.

In the meantime, Ericsson was conducting his own experiments. In 1837, he built a  screw propelled steamboat, Francis B. Ogden, named after his patron, the American consul to Liverpool. In the summer of 1837, Ericsson demonstrated his boat on the River Thames to senior members of the British Admiralty, including Surveyor of the Navy Sir William Symonds. The Admiralty maintained the view that screw propulsion would be ineffective in ocean-going service, while Symonds himself believed that screw propelled ships could not be steered efficiently. Following this rejection, Ericsson built a second, larger screw-propelled boat, Robert F. Stockton, and had her sailed in 1839 to the United States, where he was soon to gain fame as the designer of the U.S. Navy's first screw-propelled warship, .

Apparently aware of the Navy's view that screw propellers would prove unsuitable for seagoing service, Smith determined to prove this assumption wrong. In September 1837, he took his small vessel (now fitted with an iron propeller of a single turn) to sea, steaming from Blackwall, London to Hythe, Kent, with stops at Ramsgate, Dover and Folkestone. On the way back to London on the 25th, Smith's craft was observed making headway in stormy seas by officers of the Royal Navy. The Admiralty's interest in the technology was revived, and Smith was encouraged to build a full size ship to more conclusively demonstrate the technology's effectiveness. He was able to attract a number of investors to provide the necessary capital, including the banker Wright and the engineering firm of J. and G. Rennie, who together formed a new company called the Ship Propeller Company. The company's proposed vessel was initially tentatively named Propeller, but the name eventually adopted for the ship was Archimedes, after the 3rd century Greek inventor.

Design and construction

Archimedes was built in London in 1838 by Henry Wimshurst. According to F. P. Smith himself, the ship was constructed of English oak, but a later entry in Lloyd's Register indicates that parts of the keel at least were of Baltic fir. Built to a schooner pattern, with classic hull lines and a slender, raking funnel and masts, she was considered by contemporaries to be a beautiful vessel.

Machinery
 
Smith initially had some difficulty sourcing suitable engines for the ship, as screw propulsion presented some unfamiliar technical challenges. Eventually the leading engineering firm of J. and G. Rennie agreed to design and supply the engines, and the Rennies themselves were persuaded to take a financial interest in the ship and its technology.

The twin engines supplied by the Rennies each had two  cylinders with a  stroke, delivering a combined nominal horsepower of about 80, and an actual horsepower of about 60. The engines ran at 26 rpm, which through gearing drove the propeller shaft at about 140 rpm. The boilers operated at a pressure of 6 psi. The engines were installed in early 1839, following the ship's launch in October 1838.

The gearing provided some additional technical problems. Smith geared the engines to the propeller via spur-wheels and pinions, the largest of which was toothed with hornbeam (a white timber traditionally used for gearing in windmills). The gearing arrangement proved to be very noisy, and the ship's stern was subject to considerable vibration in operation. Smith planned to reduce the noise by the use of spiral gears, but it is unclear whether this modification was ever carried out.

Following the ship's entry into service, the propeller would subsequently undergo a number of modifications, the most important of which were an alteration to a double threaded/half turn format, and a division of the original 360° screw into two separate blades. The propeller had the unusual feature of being fully retractable in order to reduce drag when the ship was under sail—a task that took about 15 minutes.

Service history

Archimedes made her maiden voyage, from London to Sheerness near the mouth of the Thames, commencing 2 May 1839. At Portsmouth, Archimedes was successfully trialed against one of the swiftest vessels then in Admiralty service, in the presence of some senior Navy officials, who were impressed by Archimedes''' performance.

Breakdowns and propeller redesign

After this initial trial Archimedes embarked on a return voyage to London, but while in transit the ship's boiler—which lacked either a gauge or a safety valve—exploded, killing the second engineer and scalding several others. The vessel was then laid up for five months for repairs at Wimshurst's shipyard.

On resuming service, Smith received an invitation from the Dutch government to bring the vessel to the Netherlands for a demonstration, which he accepted. On the voyage to the Texel however, Archimedes broke her crankshaft and was forced to return to England for further repairs, which on this occasion were effected by the firm of Miller, Ravenhill & Co. It was during this refit that the original full helix, single turn, single threaded propeller was replaced by a double-threaded, half turn propeller with two distinct blades. The new propeller had the advantage of considerably reducing the ship's vibration at the stern.

Dover trials

Following these repairs, the British Admiralty arranged with Smith to undertake a new series of trials for Archimedes at Dover. Captain Edward Chappell, RN, was appointed by the Admiralty to oversee the trials and write a report. From April to May 1840, Archimedes was tested against the Navy's fastest Dover-Calais mail packets, the paddlewheelers Ariel, Beaver, Swallow and Widgeon.

The most telling of these trials were against Widgeon, which was not only the fastest of the mail packets, but also the closest ship in size and horsepower to Archimedes. Widgeon proved to be slightly faster than Archimedes in smooth seas, but Chappell concluded that as the latter had a lower horsepower-to-weight ratio, the screw propeller as a means of propulsion had proven "equal, if not superior, to that of the ordinary paddle-wheel." This finding was more decisive than it may appear, because from a naval perspective, screw propulsion had only to prove itself approximately equal in efficiency to paddlewheel propulsion, as paddlewheels had well recognized shortcomings in military use. These included the exposure of the paddlewheel and its engines to enemy fire, as well as the reduction of space available for the placement of cannon which impinged upon a warship's broadside firepower. Chappell's report would later lead to the adoption of screw propulsion by the Navy (see Legacy section below).

Circumnavigation of Britain and other voyages

With the conclusion of the Dover trials, Archimedes was placed at the disposal of Captain Chappell for a circumnavigation of Britain, which took place in July 1840. This voyage presented an opportunity to not only conduct further tests, but also to allow inspection of the technology by shipowners, engineers and scientists in ports throughout the country.

With the completion of this voyage, Archimedes made a passage from Plymouth to Oporto, Portugal in the record time of 68½ hours. The ship subsequently made further voyages to Antwerp, to Amsterdam via the North Holland Canal, and to various other ports on the continent, exciting interest in the new propulsion method everywhere.

Loan to Brunel

Upon the return of Archimedes to England, Smith agreed to loan Archimedes for several months to the Great Western Steamship Company, which was in the process of constructing the world's largest steamship, . Great Western's principal engineer,  Isambard Kingdom Brunel, took advantage of the loan to test Archimedes with a variety of different propellers in an attempt to find the most efficient design, which was eventually determined to be a new four-bladed model submitted by Smith.

Brunel's experiments led him to recommend to his employers the adoption of screw propulsion for Great Britain. The advantages of screw propulsion listed by Brunel can be summarized as follows:
 Screw propulsion machinery was lighter in weight, thus improving fuel economy;
 Screw propulsion machinery could be kept lower in the hull, reducing the ship's centre of gravity and making it more stable in heavy seas;
 By taking up less room, propeller engines would allow more cargo to be carried;
 Elimination of bulky paddle-boxes would lessen resistance through the water, and also allow the ship to manoeuvre more easily in confined waterways;
 The depth of a paddlewheel is constantly changing, depending on the ship's cargo and the movement of waves, while a propeller stays fully submerged and at full efficiency at all times;
 Screw propulsion machinery was cheaper.

By these arguments, Brunel in December 1840 was able to persuade the Great Western Steamship Company to adopt screw propulsion for Great Britain, thus making her the world's first screw-propelled transatlantic steamer. Instead of using Smith's proven design, however, Brunel later decided to install a six-bladed "windmill" propeller designed by himself. Brunel's design proved defective and was quickly replaced with the original design.

Later career

Smith and his fellow investors had originally hoped to sell Archimedes to the Royal Navy, but when this did not eventuate, the Ship Propeller Company sold the vessel into commercial service. The company, which is estimated to have lost a total of about £50,000 on the Archimedes venture, was subsequently wound up.

The later career of Archimedes is sketchy. The ship ran aground at Beachy Head in 1840. In 1845, she disappeared from Lloyd's Register, but appeared again in 1847 following an overhaul. Her engines and machinery were removed on an unspecified date at Sunderland, after which she continued in service as a sailing ship. In 1850, she was certified as belonging to the Elbe & Humber Steam Navigation Company, trading between Hamburg and Hull. In 1852, her sails and rigging were renewed, but she disappeared from the Register again a year or two later. In early November 1852, there was a fire in her aft hold whilst on a voyage from Hull to Hamburg. She arrived at Hamburg on 9 November with the aft hold flooded. She reportedly ended her career in the 1850s, in service between Chile and Australia. A schooner of that name was wrecked on 27 January 1857 in the Tuamotus, while sailing between Valparaiso and Melbourne.

Legacy

Although the adoption of the screw propeller was an historical inevitability given the work of John Ericsson and others, Archimedes considerably hastened acceptance of the technology. The Dover trials, carried out in April–May 1840, persuaded the Royal Navy to build a 900-ton steam sloop-of-war, which was trialled from 1843 to 1845 against HMS Alecto, a sister ship fitted with paddle propulsion. As a result of these trials, the Navy adopted the screw propeller as its preferred propulsion method. By 1855, 174 ships of the Royal Navy had been fitted with screw propulsion, including 52 ships-of-the-line, 23 frigates, 17 corvettes, 55 sloops, and various other vessels.

Some merchants were also quick to adopt screw propulsion. In 1840, Wimshurst built a second propeller-driven vessel, the 300-ton Novelty, the first screw-propelled cargo ship and the first to make a commercial voyage. In 1841, a small passenger steamer fitted with Smith's patented propeller, Princess Royal, was built in the north of England, and in 1842, several more screw-propelled vessels were built or launched in Britain, including Bedlington, built at South Shields, Bee, launched at Chatham, and the largest ship built to that date in Ireland, Great Northern, launched at Derry. From this point, screw-propelled merchant ships grew rapidly in number. By the time the Cunard Line built the paddle steamer Persia for transatlantic service in 1856, the paddlewheel was already becoming an anachronism.Fox, p. 162.

Though Smith's Archimedes'' had played an important role in the introduction of screw propulsion, Smith himself only lost money on the venture, and was forced to return to farming. He would later be recognized for his contribution however. In 1855, he was amongst five inventors awarded £4,000 each by the House of Commons for invention of the marine propeller. In 1858, a group of patrons arranged a testimonial dinner at which he was presented with a silver salver, claret-jug and subscription, with an aggregate value of £2,678. In 1860, Smith was appointed Curator of the Patent Office Museum in South Kensington, and in 1871 he received a knighthood.

Footnotes

References
Books
 
 
 
 
 
 
 
 
 
 
 
 
 
 

Journals

External links
 

1838 ships
Ships built on the River Thames
Experimental ships
Victorian-era merchant ships of the United Kingdom
Shipwrecks of the Netherlands
Maritime incidents in November 1852